Church is an English surname.  Notable people with the surname include:
 Albert T. Church (born 1947), Vice-Admiral in the United States Navy
Alfred John Church (1829–1912) an English classical scholar
 Alonzo Church (1903–1995), logician, famous for the Church-Turing thesis and lambda calculus
 Arthur Harry Church (1865–1937), British botanist and botanical illustrator
 Arthur Herbert Church (1834–1915), British chemist
 Austin Church (1799–1879), American physician and entrepreneur
 Captain Benjamin Church (1639–1718), colonial officer during King Philip's War
 Benjamin Church (physician) (1734–1776), first Surgeon General of the Continental Army and grandson of Captain Benjamin Church
 Benjamin Church (carpenter) (1807–1887), American pioneer and builder of Milwaukee, Wisconsin
 Bethine Clark Church (1923–2013), spouse of American senator Frank Church
 Brad Church (born 1976), Canadian ice hockey player
 Charlotte Church (born 1986), Welsh soprano singer and talk show host
 Doug Church (born 1968), video-game designer
 Elihu Dwight Church (1836–1908), American book collector and philanthropist
 Ellen Church (1904–1965), first airline stewardess
 Eric Church (born 1977), American country music singer
 Forrest Church (born 1948), American minister, son of Senator Frank Church
 Francis Pharcellus Church (1839–1906), American writer (famous for the editorial Yes, Virginia, there is a Santa Claus)
 Frank Church (1924–1984), four-term U.S. Senator from Idaho.
 Frederic Edwin Church (1826–1900), landscape painter
 Frederic A. Church (1878–1936), American engineer and early roller coaster designer.
 Frederick Stuart Church (1842–1924), American artist.
 George Church (geneticist) (born 1954), Harvard geneticist, molecular engineer, and chemist, founder of the Personal Genome Project.
 George W. Church Sr. (1903–1956), founder of Church's Chicken, a chain of franchised fried chicken restaurants
 Gerald Church (born 1928), Scottish footballer
 Kenneth Church (1930–2020), Canadian jockey
 James E. Church (1869–1959), pioneered the techniques used to measure snow and forecast seasonal water supplies
 John A. Church (born 1951), an expert on sea-level and its changes
 Judith Church (born 1953), a politician in the United Kingdom
 Leonard C. Church (1846–1915), American businessman, farmer, and politician
 Lewis Church (born 1928), English cricketer
 Louis K. Church (1845–1898), New York Supreme Court justice
 Mary Church Terrell (1863–1954), American writer and civil-rights activist
 Mike Church (born 1962), a Southern United States radio commentator
 Richard Church (general) (1784–1873), a British military officer and general in the Greek army
 Richard William Church (1825–1890), an English divine, nephew of the general
 Richard Church (poet) (1893–1972), an English poet and man of letters
 Robert Reed Church (1839–1912), the first African-American millionaire
 Rosemary Church, (born 1962), TV anchor
 Ryan Church (born 1978), an American baseball player
 Simon Church (born 1988), Welsh international footballer
 Thomas Church (1798–1860), a British colonial administrator under the British East India Company
 Thomas Church (landscape architect) (1902–1978), American landscape architect
 Thomas Haden Church (born 1961), American actor in television and film
 Thomas Langton Church (1870–1950), Canadian politician
 Walter G. Church Sr. (1927–2012), member of the North Carolina General Assembly
 William Church (c. 1778 – 1863), American inventor who patented a typesetting machine in 1822

English-language surnames
English toponymic surnames